Stanton Gate railway station served the village of Stanton Gate, Derbyshire, England from 1851 to 1967 on the Erewash Valley Line.

History 
The station opened in July 1851 by the Midland Railway. It closed to both passengers and goods traffic on 2 January 1967.

Rail accident 
On 6 December 1963 at 01:32 the previous evening's 22:40 Leeds-Leicester freight train hauled by Type 4 diesel locomotive No. D94 travelling at about 45mph passed at least two stop signals and collided diagonally with the 01:00 Toton-Woodhouse Mill goods train which was crossing under clear signals from the No.1 Down goods line across the up and down main lines to the No.2 down goods line. The front end of D94 on the Leeds train was almost totally destroyed unfortunately causing the deaths of the driver and his second man.

References

External links 

Disused railway stations in Derbyshire
Railway stations in Great Britain opened in 1847
Railway stations in Great Britain closed in 1967
1847 establishments in England
1967 disestablishments in England
Former Midland Railway stations
Beeching closures in England